Tibs or TIBS may refer to:

Tibs, a form of Ethiopian cuisine
SMRT Buses, a bus operator in Singapore formerly known as the Trans Island Bus Service
Tibs the Great, British Post Office cat
Trojan.Tibs, an alternate name of the Storm Worm computer virus

See also
TIB (disambiguation)
Tibbs (disambiguation)